The list of cancelled video game lists is indexed by video game manufacturer, then by platform.

Nintendo

 List of cancelled NES games
 List of cancelled Game Boy games
 List of cancelled Super NES games
 List of cancelled Nintendo 64 games
 List of cancelled Game Boy Color games
 List of cancelled Game Boy Advance games
 List of cancelled GameCube games
 List of cancelled Nintendo DS games
 List of cancelled Wii games
 List of cancelled Nintendo 3DS games
 List of cancelled Wii U games
 List of cancelled Nintendo Switch games

Sega
 List of cancelled Sega Master System games
 List of cancelled Sega Game Gear games
 List of cancelled Sega Genesis games
 List of cancelled Sega CD games
 List of cancelled 32X games
 List of cancelled Sega Saturn games
 List of cancelled Dreamcast games

Sony

 List of cancelled PlayStation video games
 List of cancelled PlayStation 2 video games
 List of cancelled PlayStation Portable video games
 List of cancelled PlayStation Vita games
 List of cancelled PlayStation 4 video games

Other
 List of cancelled 3DO Interactive Multiplayer games
 List of cancelled Atari Lynx games
 List of cancelled Atari Jaguar games
 List of cancelled games for Commodore platforms
 List of cancelled games for NEC consoles
 List of cancelled X68000 games
 List of cancelled games for SNK consoles

See also
 Lists of video games
 List of video game websites
 List of video gaming topics